Ashland is a station on the Chicago Transit Authority's 'L' system, serving the Orange Line. It is located at the intersection of Ashland Avenue and 31st Street near the Stevenson Expressway. Although located within the Lower West Side community area, the station mostly serves the Bridgeport and McKinley Park neighborhoods.

History

Ashland, which opened on October 31, 1993, is quite similar to other stations in the Orange Line and has a layout based on those of the Dan Ryan Line, except that unlike the last stations of the Dan Ryan Branch of the Red Line, this station is not located in the middle of a highway. It is composed of a central platform overlooking the entrance and is equipped with escalators and elevators for ADA accessibility. Unlike other stations on the Orange Line, Ashland does not have a park and ride facility.

Bus connections
CTA
  9 Ashland (Owl Service) 
  X9 Ashland Express (Weekday Rush Hours only) 
  31 31st (Weekdays only) 
  62 Archer (Owl Service)

See also 
Ashland (CTA Green and Pink Lines station)
Ashland/63rd (CTA station)

Notes and references

Notes

References

External links 
Chicago L.org: Stations - Ashland

Ashland Station Page CTA official site
Ashland Avenue entrance from Google Maps Street View

Bridgeport, Chicago
CTA Orange Line stations
Railway stations in the United States opened in 1993
Lower West Side, Chicago
1993 establishments in Illinois